The Sacramento-class fast combat support ships were a class of four United States Navy supply ships used to refuel, rearm, and restock ships in the United States Navy in both the Atlantic and Pacific Oceans.

History
The idea of combining the capabilities of a fleet oiler (AO), ammunition ship (AE), and refrigerated stores ship (AF) had been conceived during the Second World War by Admiral Arleigh Burke, later Chief of Naval Operations, who sought to create a single ship that would perform the functions of three vessels while simultaneously integrating into a carrier battle group. This was deemed necessary because World War II replenishments had to be scheduled well in advance due to communications problems and were subject to change due to weather or combat related reasons. On top of that the Underway Replenishment Groups of that time were slow and unwieldy. After experimenting with this "replenishment oiler" concept with the German war prize  (placed in service as ), the US Navy's solution to these problems was to create a multi-product station ship, which resulted in the construction of the Sacramento class. The Sacramentos had been designed to carry more fuel and ammunition than the largest ammunition ships then in service with the US Navy. The AOEs were also designed to be much faster than previous auxiliaries at 26 knots, giving them the ability to operate in company with a carrier battle group rather than in a separate, slower replenishment group.  The first two ships each received one-half of the powerplants removed from the unfinished  , while the remaining two received new construction machinery. All four had General Electric turbines.

To fulfill the same role in the less demanding Anti-Submarine Support Aircraft Carrier (CVS) groups, the navy built the similar, but smaller and slower,  AORs.

Construction of the unnamed AOE-5 was cancelled in 1968. There are no Sacramento-class ships in service with the Navy, the last one being retired in 2005.

The ships that now fulfill this role for the U.S. Navy are the s. Those ships are not commissioned ships of the Navy; rather they are operated by the Military Sealift Command.

Ships

Notes

External links
Federation of American Scientists: AOE-1 Sacramento Fast Combat Support Ship

 

Auxiliary replenishment ship classes